Stanley Townsend (born August 1961) is an Irish actor.

Personal life
Townsend was born and brought up in Dublin. After attending Wesley College, Dublin, he studied mathematics and civil engineering at Trinity College. While there he joined the Dublin University Players, the college's Amateur Dramatic Society. He later co-founded co-operative theatre company Rough Magic with writer/director Declan Hughes and theatre director Lynne Parker, performing in numerous productions including The Country Wife, Nightshade, and Sexual Perversity in Chicago. He subsequently went on to perform in several productions at The Gate and The Abbey Theatres in Dublin. In London, he has worked with such directors as Sam Mendes in The Plough and the Stars, Richard Eyre in Guys and Dolls and Rufus Norris in Under the Blue Sky. Theatre appearances at the Royal Court include The Alice Trilogy directed by Ian Rickson and Shining City directed by Conor McPherson, for which he was nominated for Best Actor at The Evening Standard Theatre Awards, 2004.

Career

Townsend's television work began on a number of shows for RTÉ in Dublin. Since moving to London, television appearances have included Spooks, The Commander, Hustle, Waking the Dead and Omagh Bombing.

Film credits include Mike Newell's Into the West, Jim Sheridan's In the Name of the Father with Daniel Day-Lewis, The Van by Stephen Frears, Peter Greenaway's The Tulse Luper Suitcases, The Libertine with Johnny Depp, Paul Morrison's Wondrous Oblivion with Delroy Lindo, John Boorman's The Tiger's Tale and Michael Radford's Flawless. He currently lives in London.

Theatre
Townsend's work in theatre includes: Remember This, Guys and Dolls, Phedre and Happy Now? at the National Theatre, London; The Alice Trilogy, Shining City (for which he won the Irish Times Best Actor Award), Under the Blue Sky, The Weir and Tribes at the Royal Court, London; The Wake, Trinity for Two and Sacred Mysteries at the Abbey Theatre, Dublin; The Gingerbread Mix-up at St Andrews Lane, Dublin; Prayers of Sherkin at the Old Vic, London; Someone Who'll Watch Over Me at West Yorkshire Playhouse, Leeds; The Plough and the Stars at the Young Vic, London; Democracy at the Bush Theatre, London; Speed-the-Plow for Project Arts Centre, Dublin; Saint Oscar for Field Day Theatre Company, Derry; Sexual Perversity in Chicago, The Caucasian Chalk Circle, The Country Wife, Nightshade and The White Devil for Rough Magic, Dublin; Who Shall Be Happy...? for Mad Cow Productions, Belfast, London and tour; and 'Art' in the West End. He played Eddie Carbone in A View from the Bridge at the Royal Lyceum Theatre in Edinburgh in early 2011. His portrayal of Sims in The Nether for director Jeremy Herrin at the Royal Court Theatre in July 2014 won critical acclaim.

Television
Townsend's television credits include: Zen, Whistleblower, He Kills Coppers, Prosperity, Saddam's Tribe, Rough Diamond, Waking The Dead, Spooks, The Virgin Queen, Hustle, Omagh, The Brief, Murder Squad, Fallen, Wire in the Blood, The Commander, Menace, Seventh Stream, Heartbeat, Station Jim, Table 12, Casualty, Best of Both Worlds, Active Defence, DDU (Making the Cut), Ballykissangel, Peak Practice, Jonathan Creek, A Touch of Frost, The Governor, The Bill, Parnell and the Englishwoman, Nighthawks, Fortycoats & Co., Lost Belongings, Lapsed Catholic, Glenroe, Ashes to Ashes, Mad Dogs, Sherlock, Call the Midwife, Quirke, Ripper Street, 24: Live Another Day, Galavant, The Hollow Crown, Redwater, The Tunnel, New Tricks, Foyle's War, The Collection, Death in Paradise, Informer and  Fresh Meat.

Film
Film includes: Killing Bono, Happy-Go-Lucky, Nativity, Flawless, The Tiger's Tale, Isolation, The Libertine, Inside I'm Dancing, Tulse Luper II, Suzie Gold, Wondrous Oblivion, American Girl, Monsieur N, Mystics, The Van, My Friend Joe, Moll Flanders, Jake's Progress, Beyond Reason, Good Girls, In the Name of the Father, Blue Ice, The Miracle, Taffin, Cars 2 and Florence Foster Jenkins.

Video games
Townsend is the voice of the god Saradomin in the MMORPG RuneScape, as well as Nakmor Drack in Mass Effect: Andromeda. He also voiced Azar Javed in the video game The Witcher and Consul Triton in Xenoblade Chronicles 3.

References

External links
 

Living people
People from County Dublin
People educated at Wesley College, Dublin
Alumni of Trinity College Dublin
Irish male film actors
Irish male stage actors
Irish male television actors
1961 births
20th-century Irish male actors
21st-century Irish male actors